The Portland Japanese Garden is a traditional Japanese garden occupying 12 acres, located within Washington Park in the West Hills of Portland, Oregon, United States. It is operated  as a private non-profit organization, which leased the site from the city in the early 1960s. Stephen D. Bloom has been the chief executive officer of the Portland Japanese Garden since 2005.

Features 
The  Portland Japanese Garden is composed of eight garden spaces and a Cultural Village.  
 The Strolling Pond Garden is the largest and contains multiple areas. A creek flows under a moon bridge to connect the upper and lower ponds. The lower pond is home to many koi and a viewpoint for the beautiful Heavenly Falls.  There is a 100-year-old five-tiered pagoda lantern, a gift from Portland's sister city of Sapporo with ornamental rocks forming the shape of Hokkaidō island and a red stone for Sapporo. 
 The Natural Garden has multiple ponds, waterfalls, and streams. Trees, shrubs, ferns, and mosses grow in their natural state.
 The Sand and Stone Garden contains weathered stones rising from rippled sand suggestive of the water.  The tranquil rake patterns are often present in karesansui (Japanese rock gardens).
 The Flat Garden is typical of a daimyō (feudal lord)'s villa garden, and its Pavilion is reminiscent of the Kamakura period architectural style. Raked white sand represents water and vividly contrasts with maple trees, moss, evergreens, and azaleas.
 The Tea Garden has two areas, each devoted to enhancing the tea ceremony:  an outer waiting area and an inner garden surrounding the authentic tea house (chashitsu), constructed in Japan by Kajima Construction Company and assembled onsite in 1968.
In 2017, the Cultural Crossing expansion added three new Garden spaces.
 The Entry Garden is home to a series of cascading ponds welcome visitors. The garden continues along a zigzagged walk up a terraced stone pathway through towering firs and cedars growing naturally along the hillside. 
 The Ellie M. Hill Bonsai Terrace provides a space for the Garden to showcase seasonal bonsai specimens. The Garden partners with local bonsai practitioners in Portland and from around the region, giving visitors a chance to see a variety of bonsai examples and techniques.
 The Tsubo-Niwa is a modern Japanese garden style. This tiny "vignette" garden incorporates the essential elements of a Japanese garden – stone, water, and plants – while placing nature as a central focus of the surrounding Cultural Village.
The Garden Pavilion was built in 1980 in Japanese style by local builders: it has a tiled roof, wooden verandas, and Shōji sliding doors. It is the center of several Japanese cultural festivals, art exhibitions, and other events.  The west veranda faces the Flat Garden, and the east veranda overlooks downtown Portland and Mount Hood, which resembles Mount Fuji. Dozens of stone lanterns (tōrō) are present throughout the garden.  The lower entrance features a 100-year-old temple gate, a 1976 gift of the Japanese Ancestral Society of Portland Oregon. The Iyo Stone was added to the garden in June 1968 to commemorate the 1963-1964 tenure of Philip Englehart, the Japanese Garden Society of Oregon's first president.

As a Japanese garden, the desired effect is to realize a sense of peace, harmony, and tranquility and to experience the feeling of being a part of nature. Three of the essential elements used to create the garden are stone, the "bones" of the landscape; water, the life-giving force; and plants, the tapestry of the four seasons. Japanese garden designers feel that good stone composition is one of the most important elements in creating a well-designed garden. Secondary elements include pagodas, stone lanterns, water basins, arbors, and bridges. Japanese gardens are asymmetrical in design and reflect nature in idealized form. Traditionally, human scale is maintained throughout so that one always feels part of the environment and not overpowered by it.

History and awards 

In 1958, Portland became a sister city of Sapporo, Japan. This inspired Portland business leaders and public officials to create a Japanese garden in Portland. On June 4, 1962, the city council created a commission to establish the garden in Washington Park.
The Japanese Garden is built into a forested hillside in Washington Park on land that until 1959 was the site of Portland's zoo, when it moved to its current location. 
The garden was designed by Professor Takuma Tono of the Tokyo University of Agriculture. The garden was dedicated and design began in 1963; the garden opened to the public in 1967. On January 15, 1963, the first Board Meeting of the Japanese Garden Society of Oregon was held, where Philip Englehart was elected as its first president. During his tenure, Englehart played an active role in securing materials for the gardens and traveling to Japan to get authentic pieces.

In a study conducted in 2013 by the Journal of Japanese Gardening, it was deemed the finest public Japanese garden in North America out of more than 300 such gardens surveyed by Japanese garden experts.
The former Japanese ambassador to the U.S., Nobuo Matsunaga, said in 1988 that the garden was “the most beautiful and authentic Japanese garden in the world outside Japan.”

In April 2017, the Garden unveiled its Cultural Crossing expansion project. This $33.5 million expansion added 3.4 acres to the Garden. The addition included three new garden spaces and a Cultural Village, designed by world-renowned architect Kengo Kuma. The Village is home to the Jordan Schnitzer Japanese Arts Learning Center, the Garden House, and the Umami Cafe by Ajinomoto. The new space is used for additional educational and artistic programming and to make room for the 350,000 guests the Garden sees each year.
In the Tateuchi courtyard, there is a 185-ft-long castle wall traditionally built by a 15th-generation Japanese master stonemason.

Transportation and fees 
The Japanese Garden is close to Washington Park's main entrance, at the top of Park Place, just above and a short walk from the International Rose Test Garden. Parking inside Washington Park costs $2 per hour, to a maximum of $8 per day. TriMet bus route 63-Washington Park stops nearby and runs every day. The Washington Park Shuttle, a free service which connects MAX light rail at the Washington Park station to the Japanese Garden, operates seven days a week from April through October, and on weekends from November through March. Once at the garden, there is a shuttle that runs up the hill frequently. Because the Portland Japanese Garden is a non-profit organization which receives no funding from the city of Portland, non-members must pay an admission fee.

See also 
 Ainu and Native American power boards
 List of botanical gardens in the United States
 Portland Classical Chinese Garden

References

External links

1967 establishments in Oregon
Botanical gardens in Portland, Oregon
Japanese-American culture in Portland, Oregon
Japanese gardens in the United States
Southwest Portland, Oregon
Washington Park (Portland, Oregon)